Inger Dag Steen  (née Inger Dag; 22 March 1933 – 22 November 2019) was a Norwegian textile artist and politician for the Socialist Left Party.

She was born in Kristiansand to Ragnar Dag and Dagny Fosby. She was elected representative to the Storting for the period 1989–1993.

On the local level she was a member of Sandefjord city council from 1967 to 1989 and 2003 to 2007, and Vestfold county council from 1983 to 1989. She chaired Sandefjord Socialist Left Party from 1975 to 1978 and 1993 to 1994, and was deputy chair of Vestfold Socialist Left Party from 1994 to 1999.

References

1933 births
2019 deaths
Politicians from Kristiansand
People from Sandefjord
Vestfold politicians
Socialist Left Party (Norway) politicians
Members of the Storting
Norwegian women in politics
Women members of the Storting